Leroy Walks Again!! is the second album by American jazz bassist Leroy Vinnegar recorded in 1962 and 1963 and released on the Contemporary label.

Reception
The Allmusic review by Scott Yanow states "The set helps define the modern mainstream of the early '60s, when cool jazz was being replaced by hard bop".

Track listing
 "Hard to Find" (Leroy Vinnegar) - 6:48
 "Down Under" (Freddie Hubbard) - 4:34
 "I'll String Along with You" (Al Dubin, Harry Warren) - 4:08
 "Subway Grate" (Vinnegar) - 5:39
 "Restin' in Jail" (Les McCann) - 4:26
 "Motherland" (Don Nelson) - 5:36
 "For Carl" (Vinnegar) - 5:58
 "Wheelin' and Dealin'" (Teddy Edwards) - 4:11 		  
Recorded at Contemporary Studio in Los Angeles, CA on August 1, 1962 (tracks 1, 3, 4 & 6) and March 5, 1963 (tracks 2, 5, 7 & 8)

Personnel
Leroy Vinnegar - bass
Freddy Hill - trumpet
Teddy Edwards - tenor saxophone
Victor Feldman - vibraphone, piano (tracks 1, 3, 4 & 6)
Roy Ayers - vibraphone (tracks 2, 5, 7 & 8)
Mike Melvoin - piano (tracks 2, 5, 7 & 8)
Ron Jefferson (tracks 1, 3, 4 7 6), Milt Turner (tracks 2, 5, 7 & 8) - drums

References

Contemporary Records albums
Leroy Vinnegar albums
1963 albums